Marquis Antwane Daniels (born January 7, 1981) is an American former professional basketball player. He played college basketball at Auburn University before going undrafted in the 2003 NBA draft. He played his first three years for the Dallas Mavericks before being traded to the Indiana Pacers. Daniels then signed with the Boston Celtics in 2009 and the Milwaukee Bucks in 2012.

High school career
Daniels attended Edgewater High School in his hometown Orlando, Florida, before transferring to Mt. Zion Christian Academy for his senior year.

College career
In his four-year career at Auburn, Daniels played 111 games, averaging 13.8 points, 5.6 rebounds, 2.6 assists and 1.9 steals in 28.7 minutes per game. In 2003, Auburn reached the Sweet 16 where Daniels averaged 23.3 points and 7.0 rebounds in three games, including an impressive 27-point, nine-rebound performance in a close one-point loss against the eventual national champion Syracuse.

Daniels graduated from Auburn University with a degree in Sociology in just three-and-a-half years. He averaged 18.4 points, 6.2 rebounds, 3.3 assists and 2.3 steals per game as a senior, and was named to the All-SEC second team as a senior and team MVP as a sophomore, junior and senior.

Professional career

Dallas Mavericks (2003–2006)
After going undrafted in the 2003 NBA draft, Daniels joined the Dallas Mavericks for the 2003 NBA Summer League and later signed a one-year deal with the Mavericks. Daniels was mostly a third-stringer during his rookie season, used only when victory was all but sure. In the short minutes he was on the floor however, he showed flashes of brilliance. When Steve Nash was out with a stomach flu, head coach Don Nelson plugged in Daniels as the starting point guard and the rookie delivered with a near triple-double finishing with 14 points, 9 rebounds and 9 assists followed by a 16-point, 7 rebound and 8 assist game.

Although his reign as a starter was cut short, Nelson grew tired of the team's lackluster play following a third-straight loss and decided to bring back the classic small ball line-up in a 118–88 triumph over the Orlando Magic on March 28, 2004. This line-up had the 6'9" Antoine Walker at center and Daniels at shooting guard, and was the permanent starting five member until their post-season demise. Daniels averaged 19.7 points, 6 rebounds and 5 assists during that 10-game stretch.

In July 2004, Daniels re-joined the Mavericks for the 2004 NBA Summer League and later signed a six-year, $38 million contract with the Mavericks.

Indiana Pacers (2006–2009)
On July 12, 2006, Daniels was traded to the Indiana Pacers in exchange for Austin Croshere.

On June 30, 2009, the Pacers announced their decision to not exercise their team option on the final year of Daniels' six-year contract, making him an unrestricted free agent.

Boston Celtics (2009–2012)
On September 1, 2009, Daniels signed with Boston Celtics.

On February 6, 2011, while the Celtics were playing against the Orlando Magic, Daniels collided with Magic guard Gilbert Arenas and suffered a bruised spinal cord. Daniels laid motionless on the floor for several minutes before being taken away on a stretcher. He gave the Boston crowd a thumbs up sign, and after arriving at a Boston Hospital, regained movement of his arms and legs.

On February 24, 2011, Daniels was traded, along with cash considerations, to the Sacramento Kings in exchange for a 2017 protected second-round draft pick. On July 1, 2011, he became a free agent, departing the Kings before playing in a game for them.

On December 9, 2011, Daniels re-signed with the Boston Celtics on a one-year deal.

Milwaukee Bucks (2012–2013)
On September 25, 2012, Daniels signed with the Milwaukee Bucks.

NBA career statistics

Regular season

|-
| style="text-align:left;"| 
| style="text-align:left;"| Dallas
| 56 || 15 || 18.6 || .494 || .306 || .769 || 2.6 || 2.1 || .9 || .2 || 8.5
|-
| style="text-align:left;"| 
| style="text-align:left;"| Dallas
| 60 || 17 || 23.5 || .437 || .200 || .737 || 3.6 || 2.1 || 1.4 || .2 || 9.1
|-
| style="text-align:left;"| 
| style="text-align:left;"| Dallas
| 62 || 29 || 28.5 || .480 || .211 || .754 || 3.6 || 2.8 || 1.1 || .2 || 10.2
|-
| style="text-align:left;"| 
| style="text-align:left;"| Indiana
| 45 || 4 || 17.8 || .459 || .231 || .700 || 1.8 || 1.3 || .6 || .2 || 7.1
|-
| style="text-align:left;"| 
| style="text-align:left;"| Indiana
| 74 || 1 || 20.9 || .430 || .265 || .698 || 2.9 || 1.9 || 1.1 || .2 || 8.2
|-
| style="text-align:left;"| 
| style="text-align:left;"| Indiana
| 54 || 43 || 31.5 || .451 || .200 || .721 || 4.6 || 2.1 || 1.1 || .5 || 13.6
|-
| style="text-align:left;"| 
| style="text-align:left;"| Boston
| 51 || 4 || 18.4 || .498 || .214 || .607 || 1.9 || 1.3 || .5 || .1 || 5.6
|-
| style="text-align:left;"| 
| style="text-align:left;"| Boston
| 49 || 0 || 19.1 || .491 || .190 || .684 || 2.3 || 1.3 || .8 || .4 || 5.5
|-
| style="text-align:left;"| 
| style="text-align:left;"| Boston
| 38 || 0 || 12.7 || .364 || .000 || .739 || 1.7 || 1.2 || .6 || .2 || 3.2
|-
| style="text-align:left;"| 
| style="text-align:left;"| Milwaukee
| 59 || 33 || 18.4 || .376 || .278 || .741 || 2.5 || 1.1 || .9 || .2 || 5.5
|- class="sortbottom"
| style="text-align:center;" colspan="2"| Career
| 548 || 146 || 21.4 || .451 || .235 || .721 || 2.8 || 1.8 || .9 || .3 || 7.9

Playoffs

|-
| style="text-align:left;"| 2004
| style="text-align:left;"| Dallas
| 5 || 5 || 36.8 || .427 || .143 || .636 || 6.2 || 3.0 || 2.0 || .6 || 15.8
|-
| style="text-align:left;"| 2005
| style="text-align:left;"| Dallas
| 11 || 0 || 15.0 || .433 || .167 || .704 || 3.1 || 1.3 || .5 || .3 || 6.5
|-
| style="text-align:left;"| 2006
| style="text-align:left;"| Dallas
| 20 || 0 || 11.1 || .446 || .400 || .762 || 1.1 || 1.3 || .3 || .1 || 3.4
|-
| style="text-align:left;"| 2010
| style="text-align:left;"| Boston
| 11 || 0 || 3.4 || .385 || .500 || 1.000 || .9 || .1 || .0 || .0 || 1.5
|-
| style="text-align:left;"| 2012
| style="text-align:left;"| Boston
| 15 || 0 || 6.1 || .579 || .000 || .800 || .7 || .2 || .1 || .1 || 2.0
|-
| style="text-align:left;"| 2013
| style="text-align:left;"| Milwaukee
| 3 || 0 || 11.0 || .545 || .000 || .000 || 1.3 || 1.3 || .3 || .0 || 4.0
|- class="sortbottom"
| style="text-align:center;" colspan="2"| Career
| 65 || 5 || 11.3 || .449 || .208 || .733 || 1.7 || 1.0 || .4 || .1 || 4.3

Personal life

Tattoos
Daniels is noted for having several tattoos inscribed on different parts of his body.  The tattoos range from a detailed map of Florida that covers his entire back, a caricature of a man blowing his head off with a shotgun on his lower right arm, and Chinese characters on his other arm which were intended to represent his initials, but translate to English as "healthy woman roof". Also, he has an entire Bible verse on his chest, which he used to read to his paralyzed grandmother.

Rap career
Outside basketball, Daniels also has a career in the hip-hop industry, going by his stage name, "Q6". One of his top singles is "Come Here Nikki". Daniels has collaborated with many artists including Torrence "Lil Boosie" Hatch.

Coaching career
In retirement, Daniels has also begun to coach.  He is currently serving as an assistant men's basketball coach at his alma mater, Auburn University.

References

External links
NBA.com Profile

1981 births
Living people
American men's basketball players
Auburn Tigers men's basketball players
Basketball players from Orlando, Florida
Boston Celtics players
Dallas Mavericks players
Indiana Pacers players
Milwaukee Bucks players
People from Jasper, Florida
Shooting guards
Edgewater High School alumni
Small forwards
Undrafted National Basketball Association players